Khalkhal Mahalleh, also rendered as Khalkhali Mahalleh, may refer to:
 Khalkhal Mahalleh-ye Jadid
 Khalkhal Mahalleh-ye Qadim